The Barker River is a river in the Kimberley region of Western Australia.

The headwaters of the river rise north of Mount Matthew and then flow in a southerly direction through Barker Gorge before discharging into the Lennard River, of which it is a tributary.

John Forrest named the river during a survey of the Kimberley in 1883. The river was named after the wife of the Governor Sir Frederick Napier Broome, Lady Mary Anne Barker.

The river has five tributaries: Fletcher River, Talbot Creek, Annie Creek, Mac Creek and Wombarella Creek.

References

Rivers of the Kimberley region of Western Australia